Frank Ostaseski is an American Buddhist teacher and a leader in the field of end-of-life care. He is the Guiding Teacher and founding director of the Zen Hospice Project in San Francisco. The AARP (American Association of Retired Persons) named him one of their "50 Most Innovative People Over 50" in 2003.

Biography
Ostaseski is a former spiritual teacher-in-residence at the Esalen Institute. In 1987, he co-founded the Zen Hospice Project, the first Buddhist hospice in the United States, and created the Metta Institute to train professionals in providing mindful and compassionate end-of-life care.

He conducts workshops that reveal people's attitude towards death and emphasizes a mindful approach to caring for the dying, such as "Spiritual Practices in Accompanying the Dying", "Forming a Compassionate Community", and "Being a Compassionate Caregiver".

Publications

References

External links
 Frank Ostaseski at Metta Institute

American Buddhist spiritual teachers
20th-century births
American religious writers
Year of birth missing (living people)
Living people